Leucotmemis felderi is a moth of the subfamily Arctiinae. It was described by Rothschild in 1911. It is found in the Amazon region.

References

 Natural History Museum Lepidoptera generic names catalog

Leucotmemis
Moths described in 1911